The Local Government and Public Services Union was a trade union representing workers employed by local government or some state-run bodies in Ireland.

The union was founded in 1919 as the Irish Local Government Officials' Union.  By 1971, it had some members outside local government, such as in the Irish Aviation Authority.  As a result, it changed its name to the "Local Government and Public Services Union".

In 1991, the union merged with the Union of Professional and Technical Civil Servants and the Irish Municipal Employees Trade Union to form the Irish Municipal, Public and Civil Trade Union.

General Secretaries
Thomas Reynolds
1964: Harold O'Sullivan
1984: Phil Flynn

References

Trade unions established in 1919
Trade unions disestablished in 1991
Defunct trade unions of Ireland
1919 establishments in Ireland
1991 disestablishments in Ireland
Municipal workers' trade unions